Zvi Aharoni (6 February 1921 – 26 May 2012) was an Israeli Mossad agent instrumental in the capture of Adolf Eichmann.

Biography

Hermann Arndt (later Zvi Aharoni) was born in Frankfurt an der Oder, Germany. He immigrated to Mandatory Palestine in 1938 as a boy.
 
After retiring from Mossad in the 1970s, Aharoni became a businessman in Hong Kong and China before settling in Devon, England, with his second wife Valerie, his first wife having died in 1973.

At his death in 2012, aged 91, he was survived by Valerie and by a son and daughter from his previous marriage.

Secret service career
After serving in the British Army, he joined the Israeli secret service and spent 20 years as a Nazi hunter. He was the Mossad agent who identified "Ricardo Klement" as Eichmann.

Aharoni flew to Buenos Aires and tracked down the family's house in a remote neighborhood on the outskirts of town. On 19 March 1960 he spotted Eichmann. In his account of the capture, Aharoni wrote: "I saw him about two o'clock in the afternoon ... a man of medium size and build, about fifty years old, with a high forehead and partially bald, collecting the washing." His assistant photographed Eichmann using a camera hidden in a bag.

Published works

References

1921 births
2012 deaths
People from Frankfurt (Oder)
People from the Province of Brandenburg
Jewish emigrants from Nazi Germany to Mandatory Palestine
People of the Mossad
Adolf Eichmann
Nazi hunters